Emmanuel Lewis (born March 9, 1971) is an American actor, best known for playing the title character in the 1980s television sitcom Webster.

Personal life
Lewis was born in Brooklyn, New York, and graduated from Midwood High School in 1989. He earned a bachelor's degree from Clark Atlanta University in 1997. He would only attend the fall semester each year, using the winter, spring and summer to focus on his career.

Lewis is a practitioner of taekwondo. He is also a Freemason.
His height has only changed by  since his childhood appearances in Webster, making him relatively short. He has no known condition that would explain his height. 

Lewis is a three-time winner of the People's Choice Award and twice won a Clio Award.

Career
For his role on the television series Webster, Lewis was nominated for four Young Artist Awards. In 1984, he was nominated for Best Young Actor in a Comedy Series for Webster and lost to Rick Schroder of Silver Spoons. In 1985, he was nominated for the same award, but it went to Billy Jayne of It's Not Easy. In 1986, he was nominated for Best Young Actor Starring in a Television Series, but was bested by Marc Price who won for his performance in Family Ties. In 1987, he was nominated for Exceptional Performance by a Young Actor Starring in a Television Comedy or Drama Series, which Kirk Cameron of Growing Pains won.

Lewis was the child spokesperson for the Burger King Whopper.

Lewis appeared as himself on a TV child stars episode of The Weakest Link in 2001. He was voted-off in the third round.

He had cameo appearances in the 2007 film Kickin' It Old Skool and a 2013 episode of Between Two Ferns with Zach Galifianakis.

In Japan, he is known as a singer and has released two singles; his debut single, "City Connection," reached Number 2 on the Oricon chart.

On November 9, 2014, Lewis appeared on Ken Reid's "TV Guidance Counselor" podcast. The episode was recorded live at the Davis Square Theater in Somerville, Massachusetts, as part of the 2014 Boston Comedy Festival.

He was in Lil Jon & The East Side Boyz's "I Don't Give A F" video, at the 30-second mark.

Filmography
 Webster (1983–1989) TV series
 The Love Boat (1984) episode "Only the Good Die Young"
 A Christmas Dream (1984) TV special
 Lost in London (1985) (TV)
 Emmanuel Lewis: My Very Own Show (1987) (TV)
 The New Adventures of Mother Goose (1995) (TV)
 In the House (1996) episode "Close Encounters of the Worst Kind”
 Family Matters (1997) episodes "Odd Man In" and "Beauty and the Beast"
 Moesha (1998) (TV)
 Malcolm & Eddie (1999) (TV)
 The Weakest Link (TV Child Stars Edition) (2001) (TV)
 The Surreal Life (2003) (TV)
 Dickie Roberts: Former Child Star (2003)
 My Super Sweet Sixteen (2005) (TV)
 One on One (2005) (TV)
 Kickin' It Old Skool (2007) (Film)
 The Surreal Life: Fame Games (2007) (TV)
 The Lil Flex Show (2008) (TV)

Discography 
"City Connection", a song performed by Lewis, was very popular in Japan in 1981, reaching number 2 on the Oricon chart.
"City Connection" (シティコネクション, Shity Konekushon) (1981 July 5)
B side: City Connection (English Version)
Lyrics: Mickey Sugar, Composer: Danny Long (pseudonym of Daiko Nagato), Arranger: Michel SHIMIN, Yuka Sato
"Love is DANDAN" (恋はダンダン, ”Koi wa Dan Dan") (1981 October 5)
Lyrics: Junko Shiratori, composer: Daiko Nagato, Arranger: Masao Nakajima

References

External links

1971 births
American male television actors
African-American male actors
American male child actors
African-American male child actors
American Freemasons
Clark Atlanta University alumni
People from Brooklyn
Living people
American male taekwondo practitioners
Midwood High School alumni
Actors with dwarfism
21st-century African-American people
20th-century African-American people